Vener is both a given name and a surname. Notable people with the name include:

Vener Galiev (born 1975), Russian wrestler and mixed martial artist
Mario Véner (born 1964), Argentine-Chilean football player

See also
Vänern, the largest lake in Sweden
Wehner